Mr. Whippy (or Mister Whippy) is a brand of soft-mix ice cream produced by Wall's, a subsidiary of Unilever as part of the Heartbrand. Mr. Whippy began as a franchise of ice cream operators, but is now just the name of the soft-mix ice cream, as such, many ice cream vendors selling the soft-mix brand themselves as "Mr. Whippy" and stylise their vehicles and outlets as they wish. Actual franchises of the brand continue separately in Australia and New Zealand.

The name "Mr. Whippy" has become a generic trademark in the United Kingdom amongst consumers to refer to soft-serve ice cream in a single cone.

History 
The company originated when British businessman Dominic Facchino visited the United States and saw the Mister Softee ice cream franchise, selling soft serve ice cream from mobile ice cream vans. Unable to license the brand in the UK, Facchino set up his own Mr. Whippy franchise in Birmingham in 1958, starting with a fleet of six vans.

The company was purchased by Unilever in 1966.

International 

The company franchised internationally to Australia in 1962 by sending ten vans on a ship from Southampton to Sydney.  Following success, a second batch was sent the following year, consisting of twenty-four vans. Following great success in Australia, Facchino decided to also franchise in New Zealand, sending twenty-four vans over. During the franchise period from Mr. Whippy in the UK, around two hundred Commer Karrier vans were exported from the United Kingdom to Australia, and fifty Austins were exported to New Zealand. The company also franchised for a brief time on the Spanish island of Mallorca.

The company's franchise in Australia continued until the mid-1970s, after which the physical vehicle fleet was renamed and sold to several private operators. In 1982, the trademark "Mr. Whippy" was registered in Australia by ice cream parlour company Mr. Whippy Pty Ltd. Today, the Franchised Food Company owns the brand.

General Foods Limited (subsequently Tip Top) acquired the master rights for New Zealand in the early 1980s. The Isuzu Elf became the standard Mr. Whippy van and an orange and white colour scheme replaced the original pink and white. In early 2000, Tip Top sold the master franchise to Peter Woodhams, the Waikato Mr. Whippy franchisee, who in turn sold the master franchise to Flying Kiwi Holdings (a business owned and run by Nick Cairns, Scot and Geliana Graham) in 2006. The Mr. Whippy vans became modernised, using Ford Transit and Fiat Ducato models, various Fuso variants and Tatua replaced Fonterra Brands NZ as the provider of the Mr. Whippy UHT ice cream mix. As of the present day, in New Zealand, there are around 36 Mr. Whippy franchisees operating 58 vans.

References

Ice cream parlors
Dairy products companies of Australia
1958 establishments in the United Kingdom
Ice cream brands
Manufacturing companies based in Melbourne
Ice cream vans
Food and drink companies established in 1958
History of Birmingham, West Midlands